Ali Haisam (born 4 April 1992) nicknamed "Chumpu", is a Maldivian footballer who plays as a forward for United Victory and Maldives national team.

Club career
Haisam started his career at New Radiant at the age of 18 in 2011. He later joined BG Spots Club before joining United Victory in 2016. 

In 2017, Haisam signed for Maziya and won Malé League with them in that season. Due to lack of game time, he left Maziya to play for G Dh Thinadhoo Football Team for the remaining half of the season and helped the Minivan Championship side to secure top four of 2017 Dhivehi Premier League and qualify for the 2017 President's Cup.

In 2018, Haisam joined United Victory for the second time.

International career
In May 2021, Haisam received a call-up from the Football Association of Maldives to play in the 2022 FIFA World Cup qualifiers against China, Syria and Philippines. He made his senior international debut on 11 June 2021, in a 5–0 defeat against China, playing in the starting eleven.

In his second game in Maldives shirt, he assisted the only goal by Maldives for Ali Fasir to equalize against Philippines, which resulted Maldives to seal a direct spot in the 2023 Asian Cup qualifying third round.

References

External links
 

1992 births
Living people
Maldivian footballers
Association football defenders
Maldives international footballers
New Radiant S.C. players
Maziya S&RC players
United Victory players